Davorin Popović (23 September 1946 – 18 June 2001) was a Bosnian singer and songwriter, born in Bosnia and Herzegovina. He was well known throughout the former Yugoslavia. He was the lead singer and frontman of the progressive and pop rock band Indexi throughout most of their career. He and his band "Indexi" became founders of specific music style in former Yugoslavia known as "Sarajevo pop-rock school" who later influenced other bands and singers in Sarajevo and other parts of Yugoslavia.

Personally, he was popularly associated with the 1960s bohemian lifestyle of Sarajevo. In his youth, he was a successful basketball player. During his career, he earned nicknames including "Pimpek", "Davor", "Dačo" or simply "Pjevač" (The Singer) due to his unique voice.

In parallel with the group work, he pursued a solo career between 1975 and 1996, albeit in a non-continuous manner. On most of his solo works one or another line-up of Indexi played as backing studio musicians, so his solo career is closely related with that of the band itself. This was also stressed in the album titles when they are usually credited to "Davorin and Indexi" or similar. During the siege of Sarajevo in 1995, he represented Bosnia and Herzegovina at the Eurovision Song Contest in Dublin with the song "Dvadeset prvi vijek" ("21st Century"), finishing in 19th place of the 23 entries.

Some of the most popular songs commonly associated with Indexi were actually issued as Davorin's solo works, such as "I pad je let" ("The Fall Is Flying Too") or "U tebi se žena rađa" ("You're Becoming a Woman") from his debut LP Svaka je ljubav ista (osim one prave) (Every Love Is the Same (Except The True One)) from 1976, which was oddly the first studio album with entirely new songs that was recorded by Indexi as a group (they used to issue singles and compilations rather than studio albums). It was however released as Davorin's solo effort because the band was working on their progressive masterpiece "Modra Rijeka" ("Dark-Blue River") at that time.

Music on Popović's solo albums is generally closer to mainstream pop rock and easy-listening schlager songs, although some retained the trademark Indexi rock formula.

Death and legacy
He died on 18 June 2001 from pancreatic cancer, three months before his 55th birthday. As a sign of the highest appreciation of the city for his artistic work, he was interred in the Alley of Greats at Bare Cemetery, a prestigious place reserved for exceptional Sarajevo citizens. He is interred next to his friend and bandmate, the lead guitarist of Indexi Slobodan Kovačević-Bodo and the Bosnian basketball player Mirza Delibašić.

The Bosnian music award Davorin was named in his honor, (later renamed into Indexi in 2008), as well as a Sarajevo basketball tournament (named under his nickname "Dačo").

Solo discography

Singles
"Ja sam uvijek htio ljudima da dam" / "Crveno svjetlo" (PGP RTB, 1976)

Albums
Svaka je ljubav ista osim one prave (Diskoton, 1976)
S tobom dijelim sve (Diskoton, 1984)

1946 births
2001 deaths
Croats of Bosnia and Herzegovina
Singers from Sarajevo
Yugoslav male singers
20th-century Bosnia and Herzegovina male singers
Eurovision Song Contest entrants for Bosnia and Herzegovina
Bosnia and Herzegovina rock singers
Eurovision Song Contest entrants of 1995
Deaths from pancreatic cancer
Burials at Bare Cemetery, Sarajevo